Lake Country Christian School (LCCS) is a private Christian preparatory school in Fort Worth, Texas. Established in 1980, the school serves students in pre-school through grade 12.

Academics
LCCS offers a college preparatory core curriculum. From 2010-2015, the Average Scholarship Per Class was $1,928,689.33.

Fine arts
LCCS theater productions won a Betty Lynn Buckley Award in 2014.

The LCCS Fine Arts Program is supported by the Friends of The Arts and sponsors from around the Fort Worth community.

References

External links

Lake Country Christian School

Christian schools in Texas
High schools in Tarrant County, Texas
Private K-12 schools in Texas
1980 establishments in Texas
Educational institutions established in 1980